The women's singles badminton event at the 2015 Pan American Games will be held from July 11- 16 at the Atos Markham Pan Am Centre in Toronto. The defending Pan American Games champion is Michelle Li of Canada.

The athletes will be drawn into an elimination stage draw. Once a team lost a match, it will be not longer able to compete. Each match will be contested as the best of three games.

Schedule
All times are Central Standard Time (UTC-6).

Seeds

   (Champion)
   (Semifinals)
   (Semifinals)
   (Finals)
  (Quarterfinals)
  (Quarterfinals)
  (Quarterfinals)
  (Quarterfinals)

Results

Finals

Top Half

Section 1

Section 2

Bottom Half

Section 3

Section 4

References

Women's draw with results

Women's singles
Pan